Anisole, or methoxybenzene, is an organic compound with the formula .  It is a colorless liquid with a smell reminiscent of anise seed, and in fact many of its derivatives are found in natural and artificial fragrances. The compound is mainly made synthetically and is a precursor to other synthetic compounds. Structurally, it is an ether with a methyl and phenyl group attached.  Anisole is a standard reagent of both practical and pedagogical value.

It can be prepared by the Williamson ether synthesis; sodium phenoxide is reacted with a methyl halide to yield anisole.

Reactivity
Anisole undergoes electrophilic aromatic substitution reaction at a faster speed than benzene, which in turn reacts more quickly than nitrobenzene. The methoxy group is an ortho/para directing group, which means that electrophilic substitution preferentially occurs at these three sites.  The enhanced nucleophilicity of anisole vs. benzene reflects the influence of the methoxy group, which renders the ring more electron-rich. The methoxy group strongly affects the pi cloud of the ring as a mesomeric electron donor, more so than as an inductive electron withdrawing group despite the  electronegativity of the oxygen.  Stated more quantitatively, the Hammett constant for para-substitution of anisole is -0.27.

Illustrative of its nucleophilicity, anisole reacts with acetic anhydride to give 
CH3OC6H5  +  (CH3CO)2O   ->   CH3OC6H4C(O)CH3  +  CH3CO2H
Unlike most acetophenones, but reflecting the influence of the methoxy group, methoxyacetophenone undergoes a second acetylation.  Many related reactions have been demonstrated.  For example, phosphorus pentasulfide converts anisole to Lawesson's reagent, .

Also indicating an electron-rich ring, anisole readily forms π-complexes with metal carbonyls, e.g. .

The ether linkage is highly stable, but the methyl group can be removed with hydroiodic acid:
CH3OC6H5 + HI -> HOC6H5 + CH3I

Birch reduction of anisole gives 1-methoxycyclohexa-1,4-diene.

Preparation
Anisole is prepared by methylation of sodium phenoxide with dimethyl sulfate or methyl chloride:
 2 C6H5O- Na+  +  (CH3O)2SO2  ->   2 C6H5OCH3  +  Na2SO4

Applications
Anisole is a precursor to perfumes, insect pheromones, and pharmaceuticals. For example, synthetic anethole is prepared from anisole.

Safety
Its main hazard is its flammability.

See also 
 Anethole
 Bromoanisole
 Butylated hydroxyanisole
 Ether
 Ethyl phenyl ether
 Phenol
 2,4,6-Trichloroanisole (cork taint)

References

External links 
 
 Pherobase pheromone database entry

Flavors
Pheromones
Phenol ethers
Phenyl compounds